Macinhata do Vouga is a Portuguese parish, located in the municipality of Águeda, Aveiro District. The population in 2011 was 3,406, in an area of 31.95 km2.

Villages
Macinhata do Vouga
Jafafe de Baixo
Jafafe de Cima
Sernada do Vouga
Carvoeiro
Cavada Nova
Serém de Baixo
Serém de Cima
Lameiro
Pontilhão
Mesa do Vouga
Carvalhal da Portela (parte)
Cavadas de Cima
Macida
Beco
Soutelo
Chãs
Mata do Carvoeiro
Alombada
Moita
Arrôta da Moita
Carvalhal
Cova
Póvoa

References

Freguesias of Águeda